The Albert River is a river in the Gulf Country of Queensland, Australia. It passes by the town of Burketown and drains into the Gulf of Carpentaria.  The waters near the mouth of the river are frequented by dugongs.

See also

List of rivers of Australia

References

North West Queensland
Gulf of Carpentaria
Rivers of Queensland